Lắk is a district (huyện) of Đắk Lắk province in the Central Highlands region of Vietnam.

As of 2003 the district had a population of 55,870, rising to 64,644 in 2018. The district covers an area of 1,250 km². The district capital lies at Liên Sơn.

References

Districts of Đắk Lắk province